Wend-Panga Arnauld Bambara (born 12 September 1996) is a Burkinabé international footballer who plays for US des Forces Armées, as a midfielder.

Career
He has played club football for US des Forces Armées.

He made his international debut for Burkina Faso in 2018.

References

1996 births
Living people
Burkinabé footballers
Burkina Faso international footballers
US des Forces Armées players
Association football midfielders
21st-century Burkinabé people
Burkina Faso A' international footballers
2018 African Nations Championship players